The Wolfsklippen, also called the Wolfsklippe, is a granite mountain in the Harz mountains in Central Germany with an observation platform on the summit.

Location 
The mountain lies northeast of the Brocken, the highest elevation in the Harz, about 200 m east of the road way from Drei Annen Hohne to Plessenburg.

History 
Over 100 years ago the Harz Club erected on the summit of the Wolfsklippen one of four iron observation platforms in the Harz that still exist. At that time it had a good view of the Brocken and towards Ilsenburg and Wernigerode. Today this outlook is no longer visible due to the tall spruce trees that block the view.

Name and legend 
AT the Wolfsklippen the last wolf in the area is supposed to have been killed, which is where the name of the mountain comes from. According to another legend, the name of the crags comes from the witch hunting period, when a girl accused of witchcraft hid here with a she-wolf.

Walking 
The Wolfsklippen is check point no. 24 on the walking trail network known as the Harzer Wandernadel.

See also
 Joseph's Cross
 Schalke
 Poppenberg

References 

Mountains and hills of Saxony-Anhalt
Mountains of the Harz
Mountains under 1000 metres
Wernigerode